Dianra-Village is a town in north-western Ivory Coast. It is a sub-prefecture of Dianra Department in Béré Region, Woroba District.

Dianra-Village was a commune until March 2012, when it became one of 1126 communes nationwide that were abolished.
In 2021, the population of the sub-prefecture of Dianra-Village was 57,619.

Villages
The nineteen villages of the sub-prefecture of Dianra-Village and their population in 2014 are:

Notes

Sub-prefectures of Béré Region
Former communes of Ivory Coast